A pressure vessel is a container designed to hold gases or liquids at a pressure substantially different from the ambient pressure.

Construction methods and materials may be chosen to suit the pressure application, and will depend on the size of the vessel, the contents, working pressure, mass constraints, and the number of items required.

Pressure vessels can be dangerous, and fatal accidents have occurred in the history of their development and operation. Consequently, pressure vessel design, manufacture, and operation are regulated by engineering authorities backed by legislation. For these reasons, the definition of a pressure vessel varies from country to country.

Design involves parameters such as maximum safe operating pressure and temperature, safety factor, corrosion allowance and minimum design temperature (for brittle fracture). Construction is tested using nondestructive testing, such as ultrasonic testing, radiography, and pressure tests. Hydrostatic pressure tests usually use water, but pneumatic tests use air or another gas.  Hydrostatic testing is preferred, because it is a safer method, as much less energy is released if a fracture occurs during the test (water does not greatly increase its volume when rapid depressurization occurs, unlike gases, which expand explosively). Mass or batch production products will often have a representative sample tested to destruction in controlled conditions for quality assurance. Pressure relief devices may be fitted if the overall safety of the system is sufficiently enhanced.

In most countries, vessels over a certain size and pressure must be built to a formal code. In the United States that code is the ASME Boiler and Pressure Vessel Code (BPVC). In Europe the code is the Pressure Equipment Directive. Information on this page is mostly valid in ASME only. These vessels also require an authorized inspector to sign off on every new vessel constructed and each vessel has a nameplate with pertinent information about the vessel, such as maximum allowable working pressure, maximum temperature, minimum design metal temperature, what company manufactured it, the date, its registration number (through the National Board), and American Society of Mechanical Engineers's official stamp for pressure vessels (U-stamp). The nameplate makes the vessel traceable and officially an ASME Code vessel.

A special application is pressure vessels for human occupancy, for which more stringent safety rules apply.

History 

The earliest documented design of pressure vessels was described in 1495 in the book by Leonardo da Vinci, the Codex Madrid I, in which containers of pressurized air were theorized to lift heavy weights underwater. However, vessels resembling those used today did not come about until the 1800s, when steam was generated in boilers helping to spur the industrial revolution. However, with poor material quality and manufacturing techniques along with improper knowledge of design, operation and maintenance there was a large number of damaging and often Deathly explosions associated with these boilers and pressure vessels, with a death occurring on a nearly daily basis in the United States. Local provinces and states in the US began enacting rules for constructing these vessels after some particularly devastating vessel failures occurred killing dozens of people at a time, which made it difficult for manufacturers to keep up with the varied rules from one location to another. The first pressure vessel code was developed starting in 1911 and released in 1914, starting the ASME Boiler and Pressure Vessel Code (BPVC). The need for high pressure and temperature vessels for petroleum refineries and chemical plants gave rise to vessels joined with welding instead of rivets (which were unsuitable for the pressures and temperatures required) and in the 1920s and 1930s the BPVC included welding as an acceptable means of construction; welding is the main means of joining metal vessels today.

There have been many advancements in the field of pressure vessel engineering such as advanced non-destructive examination, phased array ultrasonic testing and radiography, new material grades with increased corrosion resistance and stronger materials, and new ways to join materials such as explosion welding, friction stir welding, advanced theories and means of more accurately assessing the stresses encountered in vessels such as with the use of Finite Element Analysis, allowing the vessels to be built safer and more efficiently.  Today, vessels in the USA require BPVC stamping but the BPVC is not just a domestic code, many other countries have adopted the BPVC as their official code.  There are, however, other official codes in some countries, such as Japan, Australia, Canada, Britain, and Europe. Regardless of the country, nearly all recognize the inherent potential hazards of pressure vessels and the need for standards and codes regulating their design and construction.

Features

Shape
Pressure vessels can theoretically be almost any shape, but shapes made of sections of spheres, cylinders, and cones are usually employed. A common design is a cylinder with end caps called heads. Head shapes are frequently either hemispherical or dished (torispherical). More complicated shapes have historically been much harder to analyze for safe operation and are usually far more difficult to construct.

Theoretically, a spherical pressure vessel has approximately twice the strength of a cylindrical pressure vessel with the same wall thickness, and is the ideal shape to hold internal pressure. However, a spherical shape is difficult to manufacture, and therefore more expensive, so most pressure vessels are cylindrical with 2:1 semi-elliptical heads or end caps on each end. Smaller pressure vessels are assembled from a pipe and two covers. For cylindrical vessels with a diameter up to 600 mm (NPS of 24 in), it is possible to use seamless pipe for the shell, thus avoiding many inspection and testing issues, mainly the nondestructive examination of radiography for the long seam if required.

Construction materials

Many pressure vessels are made of steel. To manufacture a cylindrical or spherical pressure vessel, rolled and possibly forged parts would have to be welded together. Some mechanical properties of steel, achieved by rolling or forging, could be adversely affected by welding, unless special precautions are taken. In addition to adequate mechanical strength, current standards dictate the use of steel with a high impact resistance, especially for vessels used in low temperatures. In applications where carbon steel would suffer corrosion, special corrosion resistant material should also be used.

Some pressure vessels are made of composite materials, such as filament wound composite using carbon fibre held in place with a polymer. Due to the very high tensile strength of carbon fibre these vessels can be very light, but are much more difficult to manufacture.  The composite material may be wound around a metal liner, forming a composite overwrapped pressure vessel.

Other very common materials include polymers such as PET in carbonated beverage containers and copper in plumbing.

Pressure vessels may be lined with various metals, ceramics, or polymers to prevent leaking and protect the structure of the vessel from the contained medium.  This liner may also carry a significant portion of the pressure load.

Pressure Vessels may also be constructed from concrete (PCV) or other materials which are weak in tension. Cabling, wrapped around the vessel or within the wall or the vessel itself, provides the necessary tension to resist the internal pressure. A "leakproof steel thin membrane" lines the internal wall of the vessel. Such vessels can be assembled from modular pieces and so have "no inherent size limitations". There is also a high order of redundancy thanks to the large number of individual cables resisting the internal pressure.

The very small vessels used to make liquid butane fueled cigarette lighters are subjected to about 2 bar pressure, depending on ambient temperature. These vessels are often oval (1 x 2 cm ... 1.3 x 2.5 cm) in cross section but sometimes circular. The oval versions generally include one or two internal tension struts which appear to be baffles but which also provide additional cylinder strength.

Working pressure 

The typical circular-cylindrical high pressure gas cylinders for permanent gases (that do not liquify at storing pressure, like air, oxygen, nitrogen, hydrogen, argon, helium) have been manufactured by hot forging by pressing and rolling to get a seamless steel vessel.

Working pressure of cylinders for use in industry, skilled craft, diving and medicine had a standardized working pressure (WP) of only  in Europe until about 1950. Firemen need slim, lightweight cylinders to move in confined spaces; since about 1995 cylinders for  WP were used (first in pure steel).

A demand for reduced weight led to different generations of composite (fiber and matrix, over a liner) cylinders that are more easily damageable by a hit from outside.

Hydraulic (filled with water) testing pressure is usually 50% higher than the working pressure.

Vessel thread 

Until 1990, high pressure cylinders were produced with conical (tapered) threads.
Until around 1950, hemp was used as a sealant. Later, a thin sheet of lead pressed to a hat with a hole on top was used. Since 2005, PTFE-tape has been used to avoid using lead.

A tapered thread provides simple assembly, but requires high torque for connecting and leads to high radial forces in the vessel neck. All cylinders built for  working pressure, all diving cylinders, and all composite cylinders use parallel threads. 
 
Parallel threads are made to several standards:
7/8"x14 UNF, sealed by an O-ring.

All parallel thread valves are sealed using an elastomer O-ring at top of the neck thread which seals in a chamfer or step in the cylinder neck and against the flange of the valve.

Development of composite vessels 

To classify the different structural principles cylinders, 4 types are defined.

 Type 1 – Full metal: Cylinder is made entirely from metal.
 Type 2 – Hoop wrap: Metal cylinder, reinforced by a belt-like hoop wrap with fibre-reinforced resin. 
 Type 3 – Fully wrapped, over metal liner: Diagonally wrapped fibres form the load bearing shell on the cylindrical section and at the bottom and shoulder around the metal neck. The metal liner is thin and provides the gas tight barrier.
 Type 4 – Fully wrapped, over non-metal liner: A lightweight thermoplastic liner provides the gas tight barrier, and the mandrel to wrap fibres and resin matrix around. Only the neck which carries the neck thread and its anchor to the liner is made of metal, which may be lightweight aluminium or sturdy stainless steel.

Type 2 and 3 cylinders have been in production since around 1995. Type 4 cylinders are commercially available at least since 2016.

Safety features

Leak before burst
Leak before burst describes a pressure vessel designed such that a crack in the vessel will grow through the wall, allowing the contained fluid to escape and reducing the pressure, prior to growing so large as to cause fracture at the operating pressure.

Many pressure vessel standards, including the ASME Boiler and Pressure Vessel Code and the AIAA metallic pressure vessel standard, either require pressure vessel designs to be leak before burst, or require pressure vessels to meet more stringent requirements for fatigue and fracture if they are not shown to be leak before burst.

Safety valves

As the pressure vessel is designed to a pressure, there is typically a safety valve or relief valve to ensure that this pressure is not exceeded in operation.

Maintenance features

Pressure vessel closures 
Pressure vessel closures are pressure retaining structures designed to provide quick access to pipelines, pressure vessels, pig traps, filters and filtration systems. Typically pressure vessel closures allow access by maintenance personnel.
A commonly used access hole shape is elliptical, which allows the closure to be passed through the opening, and rotated into the working position, and is held in place by a bar on the outside, secured by a central bolt. The internal pressure prevents it from being inadvertently opened under load.

Uses
 
Pressure vessels are used in a variety of applications in both industry and the private sector. They appear in these sectors as industrial compressed air receivers, boilers and domestic hot water storage tanks. Other examples of pressure vessels are diving cylinders, recompression chambers, distillation towers, pressure reactors, autoclaves, and many other vessels in mining operations, oil refineries and petrochemical plants, nuclear reactor vessels, submarine and space ship habitats, atmospheric diving suits, pneumatic reservoirs, hydraulic reservoirs under pressure, rail vehicle airbrake reservoirs, road vehicle airbrake reservoirs, and storage vessels for high pressure permanent gases and liquified gases such as ammonia, chlorine, and LPG (propane, butane).

A unique application of a pressure vessel is the passenger cabin of an airliner: the outer skin carries both the aircraft maneuvering loads and the cabin pressurization loads.

Alternatives
Natural gas storage
Gas holder
Depending on the application and local circumstances, alternatives to pressure vessels exist. Examples can be seen in domestic water collection systems, where the following may be used:
Gravity-controlled systems which typically consist of an unpressurized water tank at an elevation higher than the point of use. Pressure at the point of use is the result of the hydrostatic pressure caused by the elevation difference.
Inline pump controllers or pressure-sensitive pumps.
 In nuclear reactors, pressure vessels are primarily used to keep the coolant (water) liquid at high temperatures to increase Carnot efficiency. Other coolants can be kept at high temperatures with much less pressure, explaining the interest in molten salt reactors, lead cooled fast reactors and gas cooled reactors. However, the benefits of not needing a pressure vessel or one of less pressure are in part compensated by drawbacks unique to each alternative approach.

Design

Scaling
No matter what shape it takes, the minimum mass of a pressure vessel scales with the pressure and volume it contains and is inversely proportional to the strength to weight ratio of the construction material (minimum mass decreases as strength increases).

Scaling of stress in walls of vessel

Pressure vessels are held together against the gas pressure due to tensile forces within the walls of the container. The normal (tensile) stress in the walls of the container is proportional to the pressure and radius of the vessel and inversely proportional to the thickness of the walls. Therefore, pressure vessels are designed to have a thickness proportional to the radius of tank and the pressure of the tank and inversely proportional to the maximum allowed normal stress of the particular material used in the walls of the container.

Because (for a given pressure) the thickness of the walls scales with the radius of the tank, the mass of a tank (which scales as the length times radius times thickness of the wall for a cylindrical tank) scales with the volume of the gas held (which scales as length times radius squared). The exact formula varies with the tank shape but depends on the density, ρ, and maximum allowable stress σ of the material in addition to the pressure P and volume V of the vessel. (See below for the exact equations for the stress in the walls.)

Spherical vessel
For a sphere, the minimum mass of a pressure vessel is

,

where:
  is mass, (kg)
  is the pressure difference from ambient (the gauge pressure), (Pa)
  is volume,
  is the density of the pressure vessel material, (kg/m3)
  is the maximum working stress that material can tolerate. (Pa)

Other shapes besides a sphere have constants larger than 3/2 (infinite cylinders take 2), although some tanks, such as non-spherical wound composite tanks can approach this.

Cylindrical vessel with hemispherical ends
This is sometimes called a "bullet" for its shape, although in geometric terms it is a capsule.

For a cylinder with hemispherical ends,
,
where
R is the Radius (m)
W is the middle cylinder width only, and the overall width is W + 2R (m)

Cylindrical vessel with semi-elliptical ends
In a vessel with an aspect ratio of middle cylinder width to radius of 2:1,
.

Gas storage
In looking at the first equation, the factor PV, in SI units, is in units of (pressurization) energy.  For a stored gas, PV is proportional to the mass of gas at a given temperature, thus
. (see gas law)

The other factors are constant for a given vessel shape and material.  So we can see that there is no theoretical "efficiency of scale", in terms of the ratio of pressure vessel mass to pressurization energy, or of pressure vessel mass to stored gas mass.  For storing gases, "tankage efficiency" is independent of pressure, at least for the same temperature.

So, for example, a typical design for a minimum mass tank to hold helium (as a pressurant gas) on a rocket would use a spherical chamber for a minimum shape constant, carbon fiber for best possible , and very cold helium for best possible .

Stress in thin-walled pressure vessels
Stress in a thin-walled pressure vessel in the shape of a sphere is
,
where  is hoop stress, or stress in the circumferential direction,  is stress in the longitudinal direction, p is internal gauge pressure, r is the inner radius of the sphere, and t is thickness of the sphere wall.  A vessel can be considered "thin-walled" if the diameter is at least 10 times (sometimes cited as 20 times) greater than the wall thickness.

Stress in a thin-walled pressure vessel in the shape of a cylinder is
,
,

where:
  is hoop stress, or stress in the circumferential direction
  is stress in the longitudinal direction
 p is internal gauge pressure
 r is the inner radius of the cylinder
 t is thickness of the cylinder wall.

Almost all pressure vessel design standards contain variations of these two formulas with additional empirical terms to account for variation of stresses across thickness, quality control of welds and in-service corrosion allowances.
All formulae mentioned above assume uniform distribution of membrane stresses across thickness of shell but in reality, that is not the case. Deeper analysis is given by Lamé's theorem, which gives the distribution of stress in the walls of a thick-walled cylinder of a homogeneous and isotropic material. The formulae of pressure vessel design standards are extension of Lamé's theorem by putting some limit on ratio of inner radius and thickness.

For example, the ASME Boiler and Pressure Vessel Code (BPVC) (UG-27) formulas are:
 
Spherical shells: Thickness has to be less than 0.356 times inner radius

Cylindrical shells: Thickness has to be less than 0.5 times inner radius

where E is the joint efficiency, and all others variables as stated above.

The factor of safety is often included in these formulas as well, in the case of the ASME BPVC this term is included in the material stress value when solving for pressure or thickness.

Winding angle of carbon fibre vessels
Wound infinite cylindrical shapes optimally take a winding angle of 54.7 degrees to the cylindrical axis, as this gives the necessary twice the strength in the circumferential direction to the longitudinal.

Construction methods

Riveted
The standard method of construction for boilers, compressed air receivers and other pressure vessels of iron or steel before gas and electrical welding of reliable quality became widespread was riveted sheets which had been rolled and forged into shape, then riveted together, often using butt straps along the joints, and caulked along the riveted seams by deforming the edges of the overlap with a blunt chisel. Hot riveting caused the rivets to contract on cooling, forming a tighter joint.

Seamless

Manufacturing methods for seamless metal pressure vessels are commonly used for relatively small diameter cylinders where large numbers will be produced, as the machinery and tooling require large capital outlay. The methods are well suited to high pressure gas transport and storage applications, and provide consistently high quality products.

Backward extrusion: A process by which the material is forced to flow back along the mandrel between the mandrel and die.

Cold extrusion (aluminium):

Seamless aluminium cylinders may be manufactured by cold backward extrusion of aluminium billets in a process which first presses the walls and base, then trims the top edge of the cylinder walls, followed by press forming the shoulder and neck.

Hot extrusion (steel):

In the hot extrusion process a billet of steel is cut to size, induction heated to the correct temperature for the alloy, descaled and placed in the die. The metal is backward extruded by forcing the mandrel  into it, causing it to flow through the annular gap until a deep cup is formed. This cup is further drawn to diameter and wall thickness reduced and the bottom formed. After inspection and trimming of the open end The cylinder is hot spun to close the end and form the neck.

Drawn:

Seamless cylinders may also be cold drawn from steel plate discs to a cylindrical cup form, in two or three stages. After forming the base and side walls, the top of the cylinder is trimmed to length, heated and hot spun to form the shoulder and close the neck. This process thickens the material of the shoulder. The cylinder is heat-treated by quenching and tempering to provide the best strength and toughness.

Regardless of the method used to form the cylinder, it will be machined to finish the neck and cut the neck threads, heat treated, cleaned, and surface finished, stamp marked, tested, and inspected for quality assurance.

Welded
Large and low pressure vessels are commonly manufactured from formed plates welded together. Weld quality is critical to safety in pressure vessels for human occupancy.

Composite

Composite pressure vessels are generally filament wound rovings in a thermosetting polymer matrix. The mandrel may be removable after cure, or may remain a part of the finished product, often providing a more reliable gas or liquid-tight liner, or better chemical resistance to the intended contents than the resin matrix. Metallic inserts may be provided for attaching threaded accessories, such as valves and pipes.

Operation standards 

Pressure vessels are designed to operate safely at a specific pressure and temperature, technically referred to as the "Design Pressure" and "Design Temperature". A vessel that is inadequately designed to handle a high pressure constitutes a very significant safety hazard. Because of that, the design and certification of pressure vessels is governed by design codes such as the ASME Boiler and Pressure Vessel Code in North America, the Pressure Equipment Directive of the EU (PED), Japanese Industrial Standard (JIS), CSA B51 in Canada, Australian Standards in Australia and other international standards like Lloyd's, Germanischer Lloyd, Det Norske Veritas, Société Générale de Surveillance (SGS S.A.), Lloyd’s Register Energy Nederland (formerly known as Stoomwezen) etc.

Note that where the pressure-volume product is part of a safety standard, any incompressible liquid in the vessel can be excluded as it does not contribute to the potential energy stored in the vessel, so only the volume of the compressible part such as gas is used.

List of standards

 EN 13445: The current European Standard, harmonized with the Pressure Equipment Directive (Originally "97/23/EC", since 2014 "2014/68/EU"). Extensively used in Europe.
 ASME Boiler and Pressure Vessel Code Section VIII: Rules for Construction of Pressure Vessels.
 BS 5500: Former British Standard, replaced in the UK by BS EN 13445 but retained under the name PD 5500 for the design and construction of export equipment.
 AD Merkblätter: German standard, harmonized with the Pressure Equipment Directive.
 EN 286 (Parts 1 to 4): European standard for simple pressure vessels (air tanks), harmonized with Council Directive 87/404/EEC.
 BS 4994: Specification for design and construction of vessels and tanks in reinforced plastics.
 ASME PVHO: US standard for Pressure Vessels for Human Occupancy.
 CODAP: French Code for Construction of Unfired Pressure Vessel.
 AS/NZS 1200: Australian and New Zealand Standard for the requirements of Pressure equipment including Pressure Vessels, boilers and pressure piping.
 AS 1210: Australian Standard for the design and construction of Pressure Vessels
 AS/NZS 3788: Australian and New Zealand Standard for the inspection of pressure vessels 
 API 510.
 ISO 11439: Compressed natural gas (CNG) cylinders
 IS 2825–1969 (RE1977)_code_unfired_Pressure_vessels.
 FRP tanks and vessels.
 AIAA S-080-1998: AIAA Standard for Space Systems – Metallic Pressure Vessels, Pressurized Structures, and Pressure Components.
 AIAA S-081A-2006: AIAA Standard for Space Systems – Composite Overwrapped Pressure Vessels (COPVs).
 ECSS-E-ST-32-02C Rev.1: Space engineering – Structural design and verification of pressurized hardware
 B51-09 Canadian Boiler, pressure vessel, and pressure piping code.
 HSE guidelines for pressure systems.
 Stoomwezen: Former pressure vessels code in the Netherlands, also known as RToD: Regels voor Toestellen onder Druk (Dutch Rules for Pressure Vessels).
 SANS 10019:2021 South African National Standard: Transportable pressure receptacles for compressed, dissolved and liquefied gases - Basic design, manufacture, use and maintenance.
 SANS 1825:2010 Edition 3: South African National Standard: Gas cylinder test stations ― General requirements for periodic inspection and testing of transportable refillable gas pressure receptacles. ISBN 978-0-626-23561-1

See also 

 
 
 
 
 
 
 
 
 
 
 
 
  - a small, inexpensive, disposable metal gas cylinder for providing pneumatic power
 
 
 
  – a device for measuring leaf water potentials
 
 
  or Knock-out drum

Notes

References
 A.C. Ugural, S.K. Fenster, Advanced Strength and Applied Elasticity, 4th ed.
 E.P. Popov, Engineering Mechanics of Solids, 1st ed.
 Megyesy, Eugene F.  "Pressure Vessel Handbook, 14th Edition." PV Publishing, Inc. Oklahoma City, OK

Further reading
 Megyesy, Eugene F. (2008, 14th ed.) Pressure Vessel Handbook. PV Publishing, Inc.: Oklahoma City, Oklahoma, USA. www.pressurevesselhandbook.com Design handbook for pressure vessels based on the ASME code.

External links 

Use of pressure vessels in oil and gas industry
Basic formulas for thin walled pressure vessels, with examples
Educational Excel spreadsheets for ASME head, shell and nozzle designs
ASME boiler and pressure vessel website
Journal of Pressure Vessel Technology 
EU Pressure Equipment Directive website
EU Simple Pressure Vessel Directive
EU classification
Pressure vessel attachments 
Image of a carbon-fiber composite gas cylinder, showing construction details
Image of a carbon-fiber composite oxygen cylinder for an industrial breathing set

 
Gas technologies